Joris Jarsky (born December 3, 1974) is a Canadian stage, film, and television actor who has received recognition for being a versatile actor. Jarsky is a graduate of the National Theatre School of Canada. Upon graduation, Jarsky was cast in Tarragon Theatre’s Production of “The Awakening” for which he was nominated for a Dora Award. Since then he has acted in over 70 film and television productions and worked across the globe. His films have played at festivals all over the world including the opening night of the Cannes Film Festival. In 2009 Jarsky had 3 films in the Toronto International Film Festival, one of which, “Toronto Stories”, garnered him an ACTRA Award nomination. He has starred alongside Mark Ruffalo in “Blindness”, Edward Norton in “The Incredible Hulk”, Catherine Deneuve “Nearest To Heaven”, Lauren Bacall ” The Limit” and Ryan Reynolds in “FoolProof” to name a few. He created, wrote, produced, and starred in the pilot “The Joseph Michael Joseph Show” which was picked up by 11Television Entertainment, a division of 3Arts Entertainment. In 2016 Jarsky was nominated for a Canadian Screen Award for his performance in the Incendo film, “First Response”. He has appeared as major recurring characters in the series “Wynona Earp” and “The Art of More”, starred alongside Kim Coates in the hit mini series “Bad Blood”, and guest starred on “The Good Doctor." Jarsky recently starred in “Ordinary Days” and “Birdland”, two films that drew high praise on the festival circuit across North America. Current projects include guest star spots in CBC’s “Murdoch Mysteries” and CTV’s “Carter,” as well as the recurring role of ‘Basil Tate’ in the new Netflix’s sci-fi drama, “October Faction."

Early life
Jarsky was born in Toronto, Ontario, Canada. He became Ontario Gymnastics Champion at the age of 14.  He attended the Etobicoke School of the Arts, and the National Theatre School of Canada.

Career
After graduating the National Theatre School in 1999, he was cast in the play The Awakening and received a Dora Award nomination for 'Outstanding Performance by a Male'.
Jarsky was also nominated for a 2009 Actra Award (Best performance by a Male) for his role as a troubled young man in "Toronto Stories" .

In 2008 three different films in which he appeared, Toronto Stories, The Green Door, and Blindness all screened at the 2008 Toronto International Film Festival.  He had lead roles in Toronto Stories and The Green Door.

Selected filmography

Nuremberg (2000, TV Mini-Series) .... Soldier #2
Hendrix (2000, TV Movie) .... Jack Bruce
The Caveman's Valentine (2001) .... Boy Toy / Andy (as Joris Jorsky)
Largo Winch  (2001, TV Movie) .... Caleb Dunlop (uncredited)
One Eyed King (2001) .... Scratchy
Vampire High (2001–2002, TV Series) .... Marty Strickland
The Rendering (2002, TV Movie) .... Chad Sharpe
Bliss (2002, TV Series) .... Jeremy
Savage Messiah (2002) .... Paula's Husband
Fizzy Business (2002) .... Myron
No Good Deed (2002) .... Rudy Jones (uncredited)
Au plus près du paradis (2002)
Edgar and Jane (2002, Short) .... Jude
Mutant X (2003, TV Series) .... McTeague
it's for you! (2003) .... Julian
Foolproof (2003) .... Rob
Blessing (2003, TV Movie) .... Chris
Thoughtcrimes (2003, TV Movie) .... Alan Matthews
Doc (2004, TV Series) .... Bog Dog
Sleep Murder (2004, TV Movie) .... Alex
Show Me Yours (2004, TV Series) .... Colin
The Limit (2004) .... Brian
The Eleventh Hour (2004–2005, TV Series) .... Geoff Powell / Nick Garwood
Horsie's Retreat (2005) .... Horsie
Tilt (2005, TV Series) .... Luke
Sombre Zombie (2005, TV Short) .... Richie
Murder in the Hamptons (2005, TV Movie) .... Carl Masella
Shania: A Life in Eight Albums (2005, TV Movie) .... J.P.
Covert One: The Hades Factor (2006, TV Mini-Series) .... Tom Fancher
Drama Queen (2006, Short) .... Connor
11 Cameras (2006, TV Series) .... Richard
The Dead Zone (2006, TV Series)
Stargate: Atlantis (2007, TV Series) .... Herick
Would Be Kings (2008, TV Mini-Series) .... Marvin
Blindness (2008) .... Hooligan
The Incredible Hulk (2008) .... Soldier #1
Green Door (2008, Short) .... Rob
Toronto Stories (2008) .... Doug Shannon
Turbo Dogs (2008-2011, TV Series) .... Strut (voice)
Saw V (2008) .... Seth Baxter
Totally Spies! The Movie (2009) .... Fabu (English version, voice)
Survival of the Dead (2009) .... Chuck
The Boondock Saints II: All Saints Day (2009) .... Lloyd
Murdoch Mysteries (2009-2019, TV Series) .... Bertie Smothers / Jarius Kerr / Leopold Romanow
Peach Plum Pear (2011) .... Tommy
Citizen Gangster (2011) .... War Veteran
Foxfire: Confessions of a Girl Gang (2012) .... Construction worker #1 (uncredited)
Two Hands to Mouth (2012) .... Andrew
Empire of Dirt (2013) .... Neil
Step Dogs (2013) .... Terrance
Numb Chucks (2014-2016, TV Series) .... Woodchuck Morris (voice)
PAW Patrol (2016-present, TV Series) .... Mailman (voice)
Ordinary Days (2017) .... Ward Anderton
Bad Blood (2017-2018, TV Series) .... Sal Montagna
Birdland (2018) .... Ray Starling
The Good Doctor (2018, TV Series) .... Sergey Tirayan
Cupcake & Dino: General Services (2018, TV Series) .... Peetree Gluck the Third
Rule of 3 (2019)
The Little Things (2021) .... Detective Sergeant Rogers
God's Country (2022) .... Nathan Cody

References

External links

Joris Jarsky at MovieTome

1974 births
Living people
Male actors from Toronto
Canadian male film actors
Canadian male stage actors
Canadian male television actors
Canadian male voice actors
National Theatre School of Canada alumni
21st-century Canadian male actors